Atong may refer to:

 Atong language (Cameroon), a language of Cameroon
 Atong language (Sino-Tibetan), a language of India and Bangladesh
 Atong Demach, South Sudanese businesswoman and beauty queen
 , a village in Endom, Nyong-et-Mfoumou, Cameroon
 , a village in Widikum, Momo, Cameroon